Joseph Asajirô Satowaki (里脇 浅次郎 Satowaki Asajirō) (February 1, 1904—August 8, 1996) was a Japanese prelate of the Roman Catholic Church. He served as Archbishop of Nagasaki from 1968 to 1990, and was elevated to the cardinalate in 1979.

Early life
Satowaki was born in Shitsu, and studied at the seminary of Nagasaki, Pontifical Urbaniana University in Rome, and Catholic University of America in Washington, D.C. As a seminarian in Rome, he invited the Polish Conventual Franciscan friar and future saint Maximilian Kolbe to come to Japan as a missionary. Ordained to the priesthood on December 17, 1932, he did pastoral work in the Diocese of Nagasaki and served as procurator and episcopal chancellor. He was Apostolic Administrator of Taiwan from 1941 to 1945, and rector of the seminary of Nagasaki from 1945 to 1947. Between 1945 and 1955, he served as vicar general, editor of diocesan newspaper, and a teacher at the Junshin School.

Archbishop
On February 25, 1955, Satowaki was appointed Bishop of Kagoshima by Pope Pius XII. He received his episcopal consecration on the following May 3 from Archbishop Maximilien de Furstenberg, with Bishops Paul Aijirô Yamaguchi and Paul Yoshigoro Taguchi serving as co-consecrators, at the church of Our Lady of the Martyrs in Nagasaki. He attended the Second Vatican Council from 1962 to 1965, and was promoted to Archbishop of Nagasaki on December 19, 1968. He also served as President of the Japanese Episcopal Conference.

Pope John Paul II created him Cardinal Priest of S. Maria della Pace in the consistory of June 30, 1979. He was the third cardinal from Japan. After a 21-year-long tenure, he resigned as Archbishop on February 8, 1990.

Satowaki died in Nagasaki, aged 92. He is buried in the cemetery of Akagi.

References 

1904 births
1996 deaths
20th-century Roman Catholic archbishops in Japan
Cardinals created by Pope John Paul II
Japanese cardinals
Participants in the Second Vatican Council
Catholic University of America alumni
20th-century cardinals
Japanese Roman Catholic archbishops